Major General Michael Whitworth Prynne CB CBE (1912–1977) was a senior British Army officer.

Biography
Born on 1 April 1912, the son of Captain Alan Lockyer Prynne and Jeanette Prynne (née Crosse), Michael Whitworth Prynne was educated at Bedford School, at St John's College, Cambridge and at the Royal Military Academy, Woolwich. He received his first commission in the Royal Engineers in 1932. On 1 June 1940 he married Jean Stewart, at the Cathedral, Gibraltar. During the Second World War he served in Iran, Iraq, North Africa and Italy. He was Military Attaché to Moscow between 1951 and 1953, was appointed as deputy director of the War Office in 1960, and was Chief of Staff, Headquarters, Southern Command, between 1964 and 1967.

Major General Michael Whitworth Prynne was invested as a Commander of the Order of the British Empire in 1962, and as a Companion of the Order of the Bath in 1966. He retired from the British Army in 1967 and died, with his wife, in a road accident in Wells-next-the-Sea, Norfolk, on 27 September 1977.

References

1912 births
1977 deaths
British Army generals
People educated at Bedford School
Alumni of St John's College, Cambridge
Graduates of the Royal Military Academy, Woolwich
British Army personnel of World War II
Companions of the Order of the Bath
Commanders of the Order of the British Empire